The Adarna are an American band formed in Seattle, Washington in 2010. They are the first band that coined their genre of "Jet City Rock". The band derives their name from the Filipino story of Ibong Adarna. The group was founded by lead singer William Perry Moore, lead guitarist Andreka Jasek, bassist Jeremiah Hazel, and drummer Murdock.

Touring
In December 2015, The Adarna went overseas to entertain the US troops stationed in the Middle East and Southwest Asia which was sponsored by Armed Forces Entertainment. The Adarna performed at Rocklahoma 2017 alongside headliners Red Sun Rising, Fuel, Zakk Wylde, and Stone Sour. In May 2018, they appeared at Bratfest alongside Winger, Voodoo Fix, Shallow Side, and Bobaflex.

In March 2019, it was officially announced The Adarna would be joining Hinder for the Lucky 7 Tour alongside dates with Saving Abel, and American Sin.

It was announced that The Adarna would return to Brat Fest in May 2022 to perform alongside Royal Bliss and 38 Special.

Discography

 The Adarna (self-titled) (2012)
 How Perceptive (2015)
 Road to Resonance (2018)

References

External links

 

Rock music groups from Washington (state)
Asian-American culture
Musical groups established in 2011
Anime musical groups
Musical groups from Seattle
2011 establishments in Washington (state)